Scientific skepticism (also spelled scepticism) is the practice of questioning whether claims are supported by empirical research and have reproducibility, as part of a methodological norm pursuing "the extension of certified knowledge". Scientific skepticism, or skepticism for short, manifests itself since the 20th century as a societal phenomenon involving several individuals and more or less organised groups through several different media, commonly referred to as "the skeptical movement". This is a compilation of the various lists about skepticism with articles in Wikipedia.

 List of books about skepticism
 List of notable skeptics
List of notable debunkers
 List of prizes for evidence of the paranormal
 List of skeptical conferences
 List of skeptical magazines
 List of skeptical organizations
 List of skeptical podcasts

See also 
Lists of atheists
List of topics characterized as pseudoscience

References 

 
 
 
 
 
Religion-related lists